Michel Marc Bouchard,  (born February 2, 1958) is a Canadian playwright. He has received the Prix Journal de Montreal, Prix du Cercle des critiques de l'Outaouais, the Dora Mavor Moore Award for Outstanding New Play, the Floyd S. Chalmers Canadian Play Award, and nine Jessie Richardson Theatre Awards for the Vancouver productions of Lilies and The Orphan Muses.

Early life
Born in Saint-Cœur-de-Marie, Quebec, he studied theatre the University of Ottawa.

Career 
Bouchard made his professional playwriting debut in 1983 and since then has written more than 25 plays, including The Coronation Voyage (Le voyage du Couronnement),  Down Dangerous Passes Road (Le chemin des Passes-dangereuses), and Written on Water (Les manuscrits du déluge). In 1993, Bouchard and his theatre company Les deux mondes were awarded the National Arts Centre Award, a companion award of the Governor General's Performing Arts Awards.

His best-known work, the play Lilies, was produced as the movie Lilies by John Greyson; the film won a Genie Award in 1996.

Bouchard's play The Orphan Muses (Les Muses orphelines), was adapted as a film in 2000 by Robert Favreau. His play The Madonna Painter (Le Peintre des madones) has been translated into English and in 2010 was being performed in Canadian venues and receiving favorable reviews. It premiered in Toronto at the Factory Theatre, November 19, 2009.

Bouchard's play Tom at the Farm (Tom à la ferme) premiered at the Théâtre d'Aujourd'hui in 2011. The play was adapted as a film in 2013 by Xavier Dolan.

In 2012, Bouchard was made a Knight of the National Order of Quebec. In 2021 he was named the recipient of Quebec's Prix Athanase-David for lifetime achievement in literature.

His 2019 play La nuit où Laurier Gaudreault s'est réveillé was adapted for television by Xavier Dolan as The Night Logan Woke Up.

Notes

External links
Michel Marc Bouchard
 Fonds Michel Marc Bouchard (R14198) at Library and Archives Canada
(in Ukrainian) Том на фермі K.: Видавництво Анетти Антоненко, 2017
(in Ukrainian) ХРИСТИНА, дівчина-король K.: Видавництво Анетти Антоненко, 2019

1958 births
Living people
20th-century Canadian dramatists and playwrights
21st-century Canadian dramatists and playwrights
Dora Mavor Moore Award winners
Canadian gay writers
Writers from Quebec
Officers of the Order of Canada
Knights of the National Order of Quebec
Canadian LGBT dramatists and playwrights
Lambda Literary Award for Drama winners
Canadian dramatists and playwrights in French
Canadian male dramatists and playwrights
20th-century Canadian male writers
21st-century Canadian male writers
Gay dramatists and playwrights
21st-century Canadian LGBT people
20th-century Canadian LGBT people